Vesna Despotović (born 18 April 1961) is a Serbian basketball coach and former basketball player who competed for Yugoslavia in the 1980 Summer Olympics.

References

1961 births
Living people
Yugoslav women's basketball players
Serbian women's basketball players
Sportspeople from Kragujevac
Serbian women's basketball coaches
Olympic basketball players of Yugoslavia
Basketball players at the 1980 Summer Olympics
Olympic bronze medalists for Yugoslavia
Olympic medalists in basketball
Centers (basketball)
Medalists at the 1980 Summer Olympics